Metaphatus cirrhus is a moth of the  family Palaephatidae. It was described by Donald R. Davis in 1986. It is found in the dry Nothofagus forests of central Chile.

The length of the forewings is 8–10 mm for males and 8.5–11 mm for females. Adults have yellowish brown forewings, lightly marked with brown. They are on wing from December to January in one generation per year.

Etymology
The specific name is derived from Greek kirrhos (meaning tawny or brownish yellow) and  refers to the general color of the species.

References

Moths described in 1986
Palaephatidae
Taxa named by Donald R. Davis (entomologist)
Endemic fauna of Chile